Westport Village is a census-designated place (CDP) in the town of Westport, Fairfield County, Connecticut, United States. It comprises the town center of Westport.

Westport Village was first listed as a CDP prior to the 2020 census.

References 

Census-designated places in Fairfield County, Connecticut
Census-designated places in Connecticut